Aleksandar Trninić (born 27 March 1987) is a Serbian football defensive midfielder who plays for Radnički Beograd.

Career
In 2019, Trninić joined Al-Shabab in Kuwait.

Club statistics

References

External links
at mfkzemplin.sk 

1987 births
Footballers from Belgrade
Living people
Serbian footballers
Association football defenders
SC Cham players
FK Rad players
FK Radnički Obrenovac players
FK Palilulac Beograd players
FK Čukarički players
FK Leotar players
MFK Zemplín Michalovce players
Debreceni VSC players
FK Vardar players
FK Radnički Niš players
Knattspyrnufélag Akureyrar players
Al-Shabab SC (Kuwait) players
FK Radnički Beograd players
Serbian SuperLiga players
Premier League of Bosnia and Herzegovina players
2. Liga (Slovakia) players
Serbian First League players
Nemzeti Bajnokság I players
Macedonian First Football League players
Úrvalsdeild karla (football) players
1. deild karla players
Kuwait Premier League players
Serbian expatriate footballers
Expatriate footballers in Switzerland
Serbian expatriate sportspeople in Switzerland
Expatriate footballers in Bosnia and Herzegovina
Serbian expatriate sportspeople in Bosnia and Herzegovina
Expatriate footballers in Slovakia
Serbian expatriate sportspeople in Slovakia
Expatriate footballers in Hungary
Serbian expatriate sportspeople in Hungary
Expatriate footballers in North Macedonia
Serbian expatriate sportspeople in North Macedonia
Expatriate footballers in Iceland
Serbian expatriate sportspeople in Iceland
Expatriate footballers in Kuwait
Serbian expatriate sportspeople in Kuwait